Dąbrówka Starzeńska  (Dubrivka Starzhens’ka) is a village in the administrative district of Gmina Dynów, within Rzeszów County, Subcarpathian Voivodeship, in south-eastern Poland.

References

Villages in Rzeszów County